Nová Dedina is an old village and municipality in the Levice District in the Nitra Region of Slovakia.

History
In historical records the village was first mentioned in 1075. The original name of this village was Balwany (it means: boulders).

Geography
The village lies at an altitude of 190 metres and covers an area of 29.167 km². It has a population of about 1,545 people.

Ethnicity
The village is approximately 99% Slovak.

Facilities
The village has a public library and football pitch. It also has its own birth registry.
It also has two temples: the first (the elder) is sacred to St. Paul (The Conversion of St. Paul) and the second temple is sacred to The Exaltation of The Holy Cross. This more recent temple was built in 2000.

External links
http://www.statistics.sk/mosmis/eng/run.html

Villages and municipalities in Levice District